Johilla River is a river in Amarkantak, a pilgrim town in Madhya Pradesh, India. It is a tributary of Son river, which is a perennial river located in Central India and is the second-largest southern tributary of the Ganges' after Yamuna River.

References 

Rivers of Madhya Pradesh